"Cool As Ice (Everybody Get Loose)" is a song written by Vanilla Ice, Gail "Sky" King and Jennece "Princessa" Moore, and performed by American rapper Vanilla Ice featuring vocals from English model Naomi Campbell. Produced by Gail "Sky" King, it was released on September 24, 1991 via SBK Records as a single from the soundtrack to David Kellogg's film Cool as Ice. The single peaked at number 81 on the Billboard Hot 100.

Track listings
 Promo CD Maxi – U.S.
 "Cool As Ice (Everybody Get Loose)" (Radio Edit) (featuring Naomi Campbell)  – 3:43
 "Cool As Ice (Everybody Get Loose)" (Alternate Radio Version) (featuring Dian Sorel)  – 4:00
 "Cool As Ice (Everybody Get Loose)" (featuring Naomi Campbell)  – 5:33
 "Cool As Ice (Naomi Gets Loose)" (featuring Naomi Campbell)  – 5:33
 "Cool As Ice (Everybody Get Loose)" (Instrumental) (featuring Naomi Campbell)  – 5:31

Charts

References

External links

1991 songs
1991 singles
Vanilla Ice songs
Naomi Campbell songs
Songs written by Vanilla Ice
SBK Records singles